Star தமிழ் FM is a Tamil radio station in Sri Lanka. The channel started broadcasting on 11 February 2008 as Vettri FM.

Star தமிழ் FM reached number 1 in Greater Colombo area in the LMRB ratings released in May 2011.

References
 

Tamil-language radio stations in Sri Lanka
Voice of Asia Network
Radio stations established in 2008
Mass media in Colombo